Meghan McCool (born September 14, 1997) is a former American professional soccer player who played as a midfielder for National Women's Soccer League (NWSL) club Washington Spirit.

Club career

Washington Spirit
McCool made her NWSL debut on September 5, 2020.

References

External links
 

1997 births
Living people
American women's soccer players
Women's association football midfielders
Washington Spirit players
National Women's Soccer League players
Virginia Cavaliers women's soccer players